Heavy Weapon (or Heavy Weapon: Atomic Tank) is a side-scrolling shoot 'em up video game developed and published by PopCap Games and released in 2005.

Gameplay
In Heavy Weapon, the player guides a powerful atomic tank through several stages of opposing enemy forces in Cold War. The tank moves only left and right, while its main weapon, a turret gun, can be aimed in a 180 degree span and nukes which can destroy enemies off the screen. The game's storyline deals with a Red Star (a parody of the Soviet Union with touches of the Russian Empire) invasion, and the player takes the role of the commander of an Atomic Tank to repel the invasion back into the main headquarters of Red Star. 

The game features a total of 19 levels/missions along with two game modes (mission and survival). In mission mode, one must blast through countless enemies and defeat a boss at the end. Mission mode allows for three lives in each mission. Upon defeating the boss, the player visits the armory, where one can get various upgrades and power-ups for use in subsequent missions. After going through the first nine bosses, the player must destroy the same nine bosses in the remaining nine levels, until the final level. The new bosses are slightly different in weapons and armor.

In the PC version of the game, Survival mode only has one life, and one survives through never-ending waves of enemies until the tank is destroyed. In the Xbox 360 and PS3 versions of the game, the player may either choose to survive by themselves, or join a War Party survival game where up to four players can join. The game gives various, sometimes insulting messages when one presses the quit button, as an encouragement to keep playing the game.

Multiplayer
The game allows for 1-4 player online and local co-op gameplay for Survival Mode. The demo version, as well as the Campaign and Boss Blitz, only allows for 1-2 player local co-op.

Availability
The limited free version of Heavy Weapon: Atomic Tank can be downloaded online at various websites, including PopCap's own site. The full version, Heavy Weapon Deluxe, can be purchased for a fee. An Xbox 360 Xbox Live Arcade version was made available for download via Xbox Games Store on January 17, 2007. It features a full (four-player) co-op mode compatible with Xbox Live and a Boss Blitz mode. The game has since been released for the PlayStation 3 on the PlayStation Network and PlayStation 2 (via the PopCap Hits! Vol 2 compilation). The PS2 and PS3 versions features an arranged soundtrack.

References

External links
Heavy Weapon at PopCap Games
Heavy Weapon: Atomic Tank (360) Reviews at Metacritic

2005 video games
Alternate history video games
Flash games
PopCap games
Windows games
Xbox 360 Live Arcade games
PlayStation 3 games
PlayStation Network games
Horizontally scrolling shooters
Cooperative video games
Zeebo games
Stealth video games
Tank simulation video games
Video games developed in the United States